Introduced by HP for students, the HP 10s (F2214A) is a scientific calculator with more than 240 built-in functions, with 2 lines x 10 digits LCD. It is permitted to use on SAT and ACT tests.

It has a standard scientific layout and function set that very closely correlates with the Casio fx-85MS, allowing for calculations to be done in a short time.

The 10s was replaced by the HP 10s+ (NW276AA).

See also
Scientific calculator

References

External links
HP Review of HP 10s Scientific Calculator
HP 10s Scientific Calculator - User Guide 
 
HP 10s emulator 

10s